The 2021–22 Summit League Conference men's basketball season started non-conference play on November 9, 2021, and began conference play on December 20, 2021. The regular season ended on February 26, 2022, setting up the 2022 Summit League men's basketball tournament from March 5 to March 8.
South Dakota State was the regular season champion, finishing with a perfect 18-0 conference record for the first time in conference and team history. The Jacks would go on to win the Summit League tournament as well, beating North Dakota State to reach their first NCAA tournament berth in four years.

Conference Changes 
Due to the addition of St. Thomas (MN), the conference schedule was expanded to 18 games. Each team played every team twice, once at home and once on the road.

Head Coaches

Coaching Changes 
Denver hired Jeff Wulbrun after Rodney Billups was let go.

Coaches 

Notes:

 Year at school includes 2021–22 season.
 Overall and Summit League records are from the time at current school and are through the end of the 2020–21 season.
 NCAA Tournament appearances are from the time at current school only.
*110 Wins and 68 Losses at Division II level

**2 NCAA Division II Tournaments

***1 NCAA Division II Sweet 16's and 1 NCAA Division II Elite 8

^All wins and losses at Division III level

^^8 NCAA Division III Tournaments

^^^4 NCAA Division III Sweet 16, 2 NCAA Division III Final Fours, and 1 NCAA Division III National Championship

Preseason Awards 
The Preseason Summit League men's basketball polls was released on October 12, 2021.

Preseason men's basketball polls 
First Place Votes in Parenthesis

 South Dakota State (23) - 636
 North Dakota State (7) - 606
 Oral Roberts (6) - 545
 South Dakota - 480
 Western Illinois - 356
 Kansas City - 341
 North Dakota - 279
 Omaha - 255
 Denver - 217
 St. Thomas 120

Preseason Honors

Regular season

Conference standings

Conference Matrix

Players of the Week

Records against other conferences

Points scored

Through March 8, 2022

Home Attendance

Bold - Exceed capacity
† - Does not include games where an attendance figure was not given
As of February 27, 2022
Does not include exhibition games

All-League Honors

Source:

Postseason

Conference Tournament

The top 8 teams from the Summit League qualify for the conference tournament. The tournament is at the Denny Sanford Premier Center in Sioux Falls, South Dakota.

NCAA tournament

Only South Dakota State was selected to participate in the tournament as the conference's automatic bid.

References